Arriola is an unincorporated community in Montezuma County, in the U.S. state of Colorado.

History
A post office called Arriola was established in 1894, and remained in operation until 1933. The name is said to honor one Spanish officer.

References

Unincorporated communities in Montezuma County, Colorado
Unincorporated communities in Colorado